Fitchmoor is an unincorporated community in LaSalle County, Illinois, located on Meridian Road near the Bureau County line. It contains a few farmhouses, and a grain elevator, known until very recently as Fitchmoor Grain. It was purchased by Archer Daniels Midland and became ADM Fitchmoor.

See also
List of unincorporated communities in Illinois

References

Unincorporated communities in LaSalle County, Illinois
Unincorporated communities in Illinois